Rabea Schöneborn (born 13 March 1994) is a German long-distance runner. She competed in the women's half marathon at the 2020 World Athletics Half Marathon Championships held in Gdynia, Poland.

In 2019, she competed in the women's half marathon at the Summer Universiade held in Naples, Italy. She did not finish her race.

Personal life 

Her twin sister Deborah Schöneborn is also a long-distance runner.

References

External links 
 

Living people
1994 births
Place of birth missing (living people)
German female long-distance runners
German female marathon runners
Competitors at the 2019 Summer Universiade
Twin sportspeople
German twins
20th-century German women
21st-century German women